Constitutional Union Party may refer to:
 Constitutional Union Party (United States), a party that was active in the United States on a national level in 1860
 Constitutional Union Party (Cuba), a political party in Cuba during the Spanish colonial times.
 Constitutional Union Party (Iraq)
 Constitutional Union Party (Lebanon), a political party in Lebanon and continuation of the Constitutional Bloc
 Constitutional Union (Morocco), a liberal conservative political party in Morocco